The United Parties (UP) is a political party founded in Zimbabwe in 1994 and was led by retired Bishop Abel Muzorewa. The UP is an amalgamation of Muzorewa's former party, United African National Council, and a Matebeleland and Masvingo-based faction of the Forum Party which had been formed in 1993. The UP also received members from the Zimbabwe Unity Movement, the party founded by former ZANU PF secretary general Edgar Tekere in 1989.

The UP boycotted the 1995 elections and in 1996 Muzorewa withdrew from the Presidential election charging widespread irregularities in the electoral law and administration. In the run-up to the 2000 election the UP called for Mugabe's resignation and an end to political intimidation.

The party signed a voting pact agreement with the Liberty Party, ZANU Ndonga and the Zimbabwe Union of Democrats with the aim of supporting the other party's candidate to avoid splitting votes. It exists today, although overshadowed by the Movement for Democratic Change as the principal opposition force.

Electoral history

Presidential elections 

Political parties in Zimbabwe
Socialist parties in Africa
Zimbabwean democracy movements